Xinfeng may refer to:

Xinfeng, Hsinchu (新豐鄉), township in Hsinchu County, Taiwan

Mainland China
Xinfeng County, Guangdong (新丰县)
Xinfeng County, Jiangxi (信丰县)
Xinfeng, Jiangsu (辛丰镇), town in Dantu District, Zhenjiang
Xinfeng Township, Anhui (新丰乡), in Huangshan District, Huangshan City
Xinfeng Township, Jiangxi (新丰乡), in Yihuang County